Somsak is a Thai masculine given name. It is the second-most popular male name in Thailand, with about 230,000 people using the name in 2012.

Notable people with the name include:
Somsak Boontud (born 1952), sprinter
Somsak Chaiyarate (born 1923), sports shooter
Somsak Jeamteerasakul, historian 
Somsak Kiatsuranont (born 1954), politician 
Somsak Kosaisuuk, union official and politician
Somsak Prissanananthakul, politician
Somsak Sithchatchawal (born 1977), boxer

References

Thai masculine given names